Lighthouse Field State Beach is a protected beach in the state park system of California, United States.  It is located in the city of Santa Cruz at the north end of Monterey Bay.  The beach overlooks the Steamer Lane surfing hotspot.  It also contains the Santa Cruz Surfing Museum, housed in a 1967 lighthouse.  The  site was established in 1978.

Natural history
Lighthouse Field State Beach is a wintering ground for migrating monarch butterflies.  Other resident animals include California sea lions and American black swifts.

Recreation
Steamer Lane is a famous surfing location.  Each Christmas the park hosts Santa Cruz's annual "Caroling under the Stars" event. The park is free to visit year-round, and offers walking trails, wildlife viewing, picnic areas, public restrooms, and outdoor showers.

See also
List of California state parks
Natural Bridges State Beach

References

External links 

Lighthouse Field State Beach

1978 establishments in California
California State Beaches
Parks in Santa Cruz County, California
Protected areas established in 1978
San Francisco Bay Area beaches
Santa Cruz, California
Beaches of Santa Cruz County, California
Beaches of Northern California